Italy competed at the 1992 Summer Olympics in Barcelona, Spain. 304 competitors, 228 men and 76 women, took part in 169 events in 26 sports.

Medalists

Competitors
The following is the list of number of competitors in the Games.

Archery

In Italy's first archery competition without Giancarlo Ferrari, the four Italians went a combined 0-3 in the elimination round with Ilario Di Buò not even qualifying for the eliminations.  The men's team also lost in the first round.

Women's Individual Competition:
 Maria Testa — Round of 32, 21st place (0-1)

Men's Individual Competition:
 Andrea Parenti — Round of 32, 19th place (0-1)
 Alessandro Rivolta — Round of 32, 22nd place (0-1)
 Ilario Di Buò — Ranking round, 39th place (0-0)

Men's Team Competition:
 Parenti, Rivolta, and di Buo — Round of 16, 14th place (0-1)

Athletics

Men's 4 × 400 m Relay
Alessandro Aimar, Marco Vaccari, Fabio Grossi, and Andrea Nuti   
 Heat — 3:02.09
 Final — 3:02.18 (→ 6th place)

Men's 800 metres
 Andrea Benvenuti — 1:45.23 (→ 5th place)

Men's 5.000 metres
Salvatore Antibo
 Heat — 13:33.71
 Final — 14:02.47 (→ 16th place)

Men's 10.000 metres
Salvatore Antibo
 Heat — 28:18.48
 Final — 28:11.39 (→ 4th place)

Francesco Bennici
 Heat — 28:45.62 (→ did not advance)

Men's Marathon
 Salvatore Bettiol — 2:14.15 (→ 5th place)
 Alessio Faustini — 2:21.37 (→ 44th place)
 Gelindo Bordin — did not finish (→ no ranking)

Men's 400m Hurdles
Fabrizio Mori
 Heat — 49.16 (→ did not advance)

Men's 20 km Walk
Giovanni De Benedictis — 1:23:11 (→  Bronze Medal)
Maurizio Damilano — 1:23:39 (→ 4th place)
Walter Arena — 1:29:34 (→ 18th place)

Men's 50 km Walk
Giuseppe de Gaetano — 3:59:13 (→ 12th place)
Massimo Quiriconi — 4:00:28 (→ 13th place)
Giovanni Perricelli — did not finish (→ no ranking)

Men's Long Jump
Giovanni Evangelisti 
 Qualification — NM (→ did not advance)

Men's Hammer Throw
Enrico Sgrulletti 
 Qualification — 75.40 m
 Final — 72.98 m (→ 11th place)

Men's Pole Vault
Andrea Pegoraro 
 Qualification — 5.40 m (→ did not advance)

Men's Discus Throw
Luciano Zerbini 
 Qualification — NM (→ did not advance)

Men's Shot Put
Luciano Zerbini 
 Qualification — 20.25 m
 Final — 19.88 m (→ 9th place)

Alessandro Andrei 
 Qualification — 20.14 m
 Final — 19.62 m (→ 11th place)

Women's 800 metres
Fabia Trabaldo
 Heat — 2:01.44 (→ did not advance)

Women's 10.000 metres
Rosanna Munerotto
 Heat — 32:17.01
 Final — 32:37.91 (→ 16th place)

Women's 400m Hurdles
Irmgard Trojer
 Heat — 55.49
 Semifinal — 56.34 (→ did not advance)

Women's Marathon
 Emma Scaunich — 2:46.14 (→ 18th place)
 Anna Villani — 2:46.44 (→ 20th place)
 Bettina Sabatini — 2:50.09 (→ 23rd place)

Women's Long Jump
 Valentina Uccheddu 
 Heat — 6.40 m (→ did not advance)

 Antonella Capriotti 
 Heat — 6.43 m (→ did not advance)

Women's 10 km Walk
Annarita Sidoti
 Final — 45:23 (→ 7th place)

Elisabetta Perrone
 Final — 46:43 (→ 19th place)

Ileana Salvador
 Final — DSQ (→ no ranking)

Women's Discus Throw
 Agnese Maffeis 
 Heat — 60.80m
 Final — 61.22m (→ 10th place)

Women's High Jump
 Antonella Bevilacqua 
 Qualification — 1.90 m (→ did not advance)

Baseball

Italy was not very successful at the premier of Olympic baseball.  The Italians lost six of their seven preliminary round games, beating only the host nation Spain.  Their 1-6 record tied with that of Spain for seventh and eighth places, the Italians received the advantage in the tie-breaker because of the head-to-head result, barely avoiding last place.

Men's Team Competition:
 Italy - 7th place (1-6)

Team roster
Massimo Ciaramella
Guglielmo Trinci
Claudio Cecconi
Elio Gambuti
Marco Urbani
Maurizio De Sanctis
Francesco Petruzzelli
Fulvio Valle
Massimiliano Masin
Andrea Succi
Claudio Taglienti
Paolo Ceccaroli
Ruggero Bagialemani
Rolando Cretis
Alberto d'Auria
Roberto Bianchi
Leonardo Scianchi
Luigi Carrozza
Massimo Fochi
Massimo Melassi

Basketball

Women's Team Competition
Preliminary round (group A)
Lost to Brazil (70-85)
Lost to Unified Team (67-79)
Lost to Cuba (53-60)
Classification Matches
5th/8th place: Lost to Spain (80-92)
7th/8th place: Lost to Brazil (83-86) → 8th place

Team roster
Elena Paparazzo
Monica Bastiani    
Mara Fullin 
Stefania Salvemini  
Anna Costalunga  
Francesca Rossi   
Angela Arcangeli  
Catarina Pollini
Susanna Stanzani   
Silvia Todeschini  
Giuseppina Tufano
Stefania Passaro

Boxing

Men's Light Flyweight (– 48 kg)
 Luigi Castiglione
 First Round – Lost to Dong-Bum Cho (ITA), 2:8

Canoeing

Cycling

Eighteen cyclists, fourteen men and four women, represented Italy in 1992.

Men's road race
 Fabio Casartelli
 Davide Rebellin
 Mirco Gualdi

Men's team time trial
 Flavio Anastasia
 Luca Colombo
 Gianfranco Contri
 Andrea Peron

Men's sprint
 Roberto Chiappa

Men's 1 km time trial
 Adler Capelli

Men's individual pursuit
 Ivan Beltrami

Men's team pursuit
 Ivan Beltrami
 Rossano Brasi
 Ivan Cerioli
 Fabrizio Trezzi
 Giovanni Lombardi

Men's points race
 Giovanni Lombardi

Women's road race
 Valeria Cappellotto — 2:05:03 (→ 17th place)
 Maria Turcutto — 2:05:03 (→ 32nd place)
 Roberta Bonanomi — 2:05:58 (→ 39th place)

Women's individual pursuit
 Gabriella Pregnolato

Diving

Men's 3m Springboard
Davide Lorenzini
Preliminary Round — 375.57 points
Final — 527.73 points (→ 12th place)

Alessandro de Botton
 Preliminary Round — 312.69 points (→ did not advance, 28th place)

Men's 10m Platform
Alessandro de Botton
 Preliminary Round — 334.98 (→ did not advance, 17th place)

Women's 3m Springboard
 Luisella Bisello
 Preliminary Round — 249.36 points (→ did not advance, 24th place)

Women's 10m Platform
Luisella Bisello
Preliminary Round — 272.19 points (→ 19th place)

Equestrianism

Fencing

20 fencers, 15 men and 5 women represented Italy in 1992.

Men's foil
 Andrea Borella
 Mauro Numa
 Stefano Cerioni

Men's team foil
 Marco Arpino, Andrea Borella, Stefano Cerioni, Mauro Numa, Alessandro Puccini

Men's épée
 Angelo Mazzoni
 Maurizio Randazzo
 Sandro Cuomo

Men's team épée
 Sandro Cuomo, Angelo Mazzoni, Stefano Pantano, Maurizio Randazzo, Sandro Resegotti

Men's sabre
 Marco Marin
 Giovanni Scalzo
 Ferdinando Meglio

Men's team sabre
 Marco Marin, Ferdinando Meglio, Giovanni Scalzo, Giovanni Sirovich, Tonhi Terenzi

Women's foil
 Giovanna Trillini
 Margherita Zalaffi
 Francesca Bortolozzi-Borella

Women's team foil
 Giovanna Trillini, Margherita Zalaffi, Francesca Bortolozzi-Borella, Diana Bianchedi, Dorina Vaccaroni

Football

Men's team competition
 Preliminary round (group A)
 Defeated United States (2-1)
 Lost to Poland (0-3)
 Defeated Kuwait (1-0) 
 Quarterfinals
 Lost to Spain (0-1) → Did not advance

 Team roster
 ( 1) Francesco Antonioli
 ( 2) Mauro Bonomi
 ( 3) Giuseppe Favalli
 ( 4) Luca Luzardi
 ( 5) Salvatore Matrecano
 ( 6) Alessandro Orlando
 ( 7) Stefano Rossini
 ( 8) Mirko Taccola
 ( 9) Rufo Verga
 (10) Demetrio Albertini
 (11) Dino Baggio
 (12) Angelo Peruzzi
 (13) Eugenio Corini
 (14) Dario Marcolin
 (15) Gianluca Sordo
 (16) Renato Buso
 (17) Pasquale Rocco
 (18) Marco Ferrante
 (19) Alessandro Melli
 (20) Roberto Muzzi
Head coach: Cesare Maldini

Gymnastics

Judo

Massimo Sulli

Modern pentathlon

Three male pentathletes represented Italy in 1992. They won a bronze medal in the team event.

Individual
 Roberto Bomprezzi
 Carlo Massullo
 Gianluca Tiberti

Team
 Roberto Bomprezzi
 Carlo Massullo
 Gianluca Tiberti

Rhythmic gymnastics

Rowing

Sailing

Men's Sailboard (Lechner A-390)
Riccardo Giordano
 Final Ranking — 182.1 points (→ 16th place)

Women's Sailboard (Lechner A-390)
Alessandra Sensini
 Final Ranking — 101.4 points (→ 7th place)

Women's 470 Class
Maria Quarra and Anna Maria Barabino
 Final Ranking — 68.7 points (→ 7th place)

Shooting

Swimming

Men's Competition
 René Gusperti, Giorgio Lamberti, Roberto Gleria, Massimo Trevisan, Piermaria Siciliano, Emanuele Merisi, Stefano Battistelli, Luca Bianchin, Gianni Minervini, Andrea Cecchi, Francesco Postiglione, Leonardo Michelotti, Marco Braida, Luca Sacchi, and Emanuele Idini

Men's 4 × 100 m Freestyle Relay
 Giorgio Lamberti, Emanuele Idini, Roberto Gleria, and Massimo Trevisan
 Heat – 3:23.43 (→ did not advance, 10th place)

Men's 4 × 200 m Freestyle 
 Roberto Gleria, Emanuele Idini, Pier Maria Siciliano, and Stefano Battistelli
 Heat – 7:25.53
 Giorgio Lamberti, Massimo Trevisan, Roberto Gleria, and Stefano Battistelli
 Final – 7:18.10 (→ 5th place)

Women's Competition
 Cristina Chiuso, Ilaria Sciorelli, Manuela Melchiorri, Lorenza Vigarani, Lara Bianconi, Francesca Salvalajo, Manuela Dalla Valle, Elena Donati, and Ilaria Tocchini

Synchronized swimming

Two synchronized swimmers represented Italy in 1992.

Women's solo
 Paola Celli
 Giovanna Burlando

Women's duet
 Paola Celli
 Giovanna Burlando

Table tennis

Tennis

Men's Singles Competition
 Cristiano Caratti 
 First round — Lost to Guy Forget (France) 3-6, 4-6, 2-6
 Omar Camporese 
 First round — Defeated Juan Rios (Puerto Rico) 6-2, 6-2, 6-0
 Second round — Lost to Emilio Sánchez (Spain) 4-6, 2-6, 1-6
 Renzo Furlan 
 First round — Defeated Shuzo Matsuoka (Japan) 6-4, 6-3, 3-6, 6-4
 Second round — Defeated Andrei Chesnokov (Unified Team) 7-6, 6-4, 6-4
 Third round — Lost to Jordi Arrese (Spain) 4-6, 3-6, 2-6

Men's Doubles Competition
 Omar Camporese and Diego Nargiso 
 First round — Defeated Miguel Nido and Juan Rios (Puerto Rico) 6-1, 6-2, 6-3
 Second round — Lost to George Cosac and Dinu Pescariu (Romania) 1-6, 6-4, 6-4, 4-6, 2-6

Women's Singles Competition
Katia Piccolini
 First Round – Lost to Nicole Provis (Australia) 1-6 0-6
Raffaella Reggi-Concato
 First Round – Defeated Jenny Byrne (Australia) 6-4 7-6 
 Second Round – Lost to Manuela Maleeva (Switzerland) 2-6 4-6
Sandra Cecchini
 First Round – Defeated Paulina Sepúlveda (Chile) 6-2 6-3 
 Second Round – Lost to Conchita Martínez (Spain) 4-6 3-6

Volleyball

Men's team competition
Team roster
Lorenzo Bernardi
Marco Bracci
Luca Cantagalli
Claudio Marco Galli
Andrea Gardini
Andrea Giani
Andrea Lucchetta
Roberto Masciarelli
Michele Pasinato
Paolo Tofoli
Fabio Vullo
Andrea Zorzi

Water polo

Men's team competition
Preliminary round (group B)
 Italy – Hungary 7-7
 Italy – Netherlands 6-4
 Italy – Cuba 11-8
 Italy – Spain 9-9
 Italy – Greece 8-6
Semi Finals
 Italy – Commonwealth of Independent States 9-8
Final
 Italy – Spain 9-8 (→  Gold Medal)

Team roster
 Carlo Silipo
 Amedeo Pomilio
 Franco Porzio
 Pino Porzio
 Mario Fiorillo
 Ferdinando Gandolfi
 Alessandro Campagna
 Marco D'Altrui
 Massimiliano Ferretti
 Francesco Attolico
 Alessandro Bovo
 Paolo Caldarella

Weightlifting

Wrestling

References

External links
 

Nations at the 1992 Summer Olympics
Olympics
1992